The men's 20 km individual competition at the Biathlon World Championships 2023 was held on 14 February 2023.

Results
The race was started at 14:30.

References

Men's individual